This is a partially sorted list of notable persons who have had ties to Columbia University. For further listing of notable Columbians see: Notable alumni at Columbia College of Columbia University; Columbia University School of General Studies; Columbia Law School; Columbia Business School; Columbia University Graduate School of Journalism; Columbia Graduate School of Architecture, Planning and Preservation; Columbia University College of Physicians and Surgeons; Columbia University Graduate School of Education (Teachers College); Fu Foundation School of Engineering and Applied Science; Columbia Graduate School of Arts and Sciences; Columbia University School of Professional Studies; Columbia University School of the Arts; the School of International and Public Affairs; and Barnard College. The following lists are incomplete.

Nobel laureates

As of October 2020, 84 Nobel laureates were affiliated with Columbia University. 43 Nobel laureates are the alumni of Columbia University. 19 of these alumni have also served on the faculty or staff of the university. There are 41 non-alumni Nobel laureates who have been in service—as faculty, research scientists, research or postdoctoral fellows—to the university. Columbia University does not count a visiting professor as one of its own. Only those Nobel laureates who have spent a year or more at the university are counted. If Nobel laureates who have spent less than a year at the university were counted, the number of Nobel laureates affiliated with Columbia would be 96, more than any other academic institution. In addition, Columbia ranks third in the number of Nobel Laureates it has graduated compared to other institutions in the world, surpassed only by the University of Cambridge and Harvard University. See List of Nobel Laureates by university affiliation.

Alumni and former students

Chemistry

Economic science

Literature

Peace

Physics

Physiology or medicine

Faculty, research fellows and others

Chemistry

Economic science

Literature

Peace

Physics

Physiology or medicine

Fields Medalists

Wolf Prize

Crafoord Prize
Wallace Smith Broecker—(alumnus and faculty) Crafoord Prize in Geoscience (2006), Balzan Prize, National Medal of Science, Vetlesen Prize, among other awards
Peter K. Gregersen—(MD 1976) Crafoord Prize in Polyarthritis (2013)
Richard Lewontin—(MA, Ph.D. 1954) Crafoord Prize in Bioscience (2015)
 Peter Molnar (Ph.D. 1970 Geology) Crafoord Prize in Geosciences (2014)
Walter Munk—(undergrad attendee) Crafoord Prize in Geoscience (2010); National Medal of Science, Vetlesen Prize, Kyoto Prize, among other awards
Robert J. Winchester—(faculty) Crafoord Prize in Polyarthritis (2013)

Templeton Prize
Francisco J. Ayala—(Ph.D. 1964) Templeton Prize for life's work in evolutionary biology and genetics (2010), National Medal of Science (2001), among other awards

ACM Turing Award
John Backus—(B.S. 1949, M.A. 1950 Mathematics) Inventor of Fortran programming language, Draper Prize
Alfred Aho—(faculty, 1995 to present) professor of computer science; John von Neumann Medal (2003); ACM Turing Award (2020)
Jeffrey Ullman—(B.S. 1963) professor of computer science at Stanford University; IEEE John von Neumann Medal (2010); ACM Turing Award (2020)

Founding Fathers of the United States
Founding Fathers of the United States are the political leaders who signed the Declaration of Independence or the United States Constitution, or otherwise participated in the American Revolution as leaders of the Patriots.

Alexander Hamilton—Founding Father, American Revolutionary War officer and aide-de-camp to George Washington, initiator and co-author of The Federalist Papers, the first U.S. Secretary of the Treasury, economist, one of the first U.S. constitutional lawyers (picture appears on U.S. ten-dollar bill)
John Jay—Founding Father, president of the Continental Congress, co-author of The Federalist Papers, second U.S. Secretary of Foreign Affairs, first chief justice of the United States Supreme Court, diplomat, architect of Jay's Treaty with Great Britain
Robert Livingston—Founding Father, drafter of the Declaration of Independence, first U.S. Secretary of Foreign Affairs, U.S. Minister to France, negotiator of the Louisiana Purchase
Gouverneur Morris—Founding Father, author of large sections of the Constitution of the United States, U.S. Minister Plenipotentiary to France, United States Senator from New York, creator of the Manhattan street grid system, a builder of the Erie canal
Egbert Benson—Founding Father, member of the Continental Congresses; with Alexander Hamilton, delegate from New York to the Annapolis Convention; ratifier of the United States Constitution; served in the First and Second United States Congresses

Presidents of the United States
Theodore Roosevelt—(law, attended 1880 to 1881) (posthumous J.D., class of 1882), 26th president of the United States (1901–1909); hero of the Spanish–American War (Medal of Honor, posthumously awarded 2001); Nobel Peace Prize recipient; Governor of New York; Assistant Secretary of the Navy; professional historian, explorer, author
Franklin Delano Roosevelt—(law, attended fall of 1904 to spring 1907) (posthumous J.D., class of 1907), 32nd president of the United States (1933–1945); consistently ranked as one of the three greatest U.S. presidents in scholarly surveys; Governor of New York; Assistant Secretary of the navy
Dwight Eisenhower—34th president of the United States (1953–1961); Supreme Commander, Allied Expeditionary Force; president of Columbia University
Barack Obama—(B.A. 1983) 44th president of the United States (2009–2017); Nobel Peace Prize recipient; Democratic senator from Illinois (2005–2008); first African-American president of the Harvard Law Review

Vice presidents of the United States
Daniel D. Tompkins—6th vice president of the United States, 4th governor of New York, declined appointment as United States Secretary of State by President James Madison
Theodore Roosevelt—(Law) 25th vice president of the United States, organized and helped command the Rough Riders in the Spanish–American War, Medal of Honor

Presidents and prime ministers (international)

Notable alumni and attendees

Notable faculty
See also above at Nobel Laureates ("Alumni" and "Faculty") for separate listing of 41 notable faculty

University professors 

 Richard Axel, molecular biology and neuroscience, 1999
 Jagdish Bhagwati, economics and law, 2001
 Martin Chalfie, biology, 2013
 Ruth DeFries, sustainable development, 2016
 Michael W. Doyle, international affairs, law, and political science, 2015
 Nabila El-Bassel, social work, and public health, 2019
 Wafaa El-Sadr, public health, 2013
 R. Kent Greenawalt, jurisprudence and constitutional law, 1991
 Saidiya Hartman, English and comparative literature, 2020
 Wayne Hendrickson, biochemistry and molecular biophysics
 Eric R. Kandel, neurobiology, behavior and learning, 1983
 Rosalind E. Krauss, art history, 2005
 Jeffrey Sachs, economics, 2016
 Simon Schama, history and art history
 Gayatri Chakravorty Spivak, English and comparative literature, 2007
 Joseph Stiglitz, economics, 2001
 Gordana Vunjak-Novakovic, biomedical engineering, 2017

University professors emeriti 

 Caroline Bynum, history, 1999
 Tsung-Dao Lee, theoretical physics

Former university professors 

 Jacques Barzun, cultural history
 Ronald Breslow, organic chemistry, 1992
 Samuel Eilenberg, mathematics, 1974
 Louis Henkin, international law, 1981
 Donald Keene, Japanese Studies, 1988
 Grayson L. Kirk, University President, 1953–68
 Robert K. Merton, sociology, 1974
 Robert A. Mundell, economics
 Ernest Nagel, philosophy
 Isidor Isaac Rabi, physics, 1964
 Michael Riffaterre, semiotics, theory of literature and French literature, 1982
 Edward Said, comparative literature, literary theory, and cultural studies, 1992
 Meyer Schapiro, art history
 Sol Spiegelman, genetics and microbiology
 Fritz Stern, history, 1992
 Lionel Trilling, literature, 1970
 Jeremy Waldron, law, 2005, left Columbia in 2006

Others 

 Seth Low Professor of the University Lee C. Bollinger, law
 John Mitchell Mason Professor of the University Jonathan R. Cole, sociology
 John Mitchell Mason Professor Emeritus of the University Wm. Theodore de Bary, East Asian studies, 1979

References

External links
Nobel Prize Winners associated with Columbia University
Nobel Prize Winners in Physics associated with Columbia University
Columbians Ahead of Their Time—list of notable Columbians created by Columbia University for their 250th anniversary.
After Columbia "Notable Alumni & Former Students" published by the Columbia University Office of Admission

 
Lists of people by university or college in New York City
People